National Incubation Center  (or NIC), is a Pakistan-based startup incubation program under a public-private partnership with the Ministry of Information Technology and Telecommunication (MoTT), and other entities in Pakistan including the Ignite National Technology Fund.

The Ignite National Technology Fund has established seven regional NICs. all across Pakistan as the resultant of the strategic infrastructure development component of MoTT's Digital Pakistan Policy. These NIC's Were created to give youth the proper training and facilities to start their own startups and businesses all across Pakistan

References

External links 

Pakistan federal departments and agencies
Public–private partnership
Government of Pakistan
Business incubators of Pakistan